A sweat allergy is the exacerbation of atopic dermatitis associated with an elevated body temperature and resulting increases in the production of sweat. It appears as small reddish welts that become visible in response to increased temperature and resulting production of sweat. It can affect all ages. Sweating can trigger intense itching or cholinergic urticaria. The protein MGL_1304 secreted by mycobiota (fungi) present on the skin such as Malassezia globosa acts as a histamine or antigen. People can be desensitized using their own samples of sweat that have been purified that contains small amounts of the allergen. The allergy is not due to the sweat itself but instead to an allergy-producing protein secreted by bacteria found on the skin.

Cholinergic urticaria (CU) is one of the physical urticaria (hives) which is provoked during sweating events such as exercise, bathing, staying in a heated environment, or emotional stress. The hives produced are typically smaller than classic hives and are generally shorter-lasting.

Multiple subtypes have been elucidated, each of which require distinct treatment.

Tannic acid has been found to suppress the allergic response, along with showering.

See also 
 Miliaria
 Exercise-induced anaphylaxis
 Idiopathic pure sudomotor failure
 Hypohidrosis
 Fabry disease
 Allergy
 Food allergy
 List of allergens
 Tree nut allergy
Cholinergic urticaria

References 

Allergology
Dermatitis
Immunology